Kate Robinson may refer to:
Kate Robinson (figure skater) (born 1978), American ice dancer
Kate Robinson (rower) (born 1977), New Zealand rower
Kate Robinson (sculptor), British sculptor
Kate Hudson (born 1979), American actress, née Kate Robinson

See also
Katie Robinson (disambiguation)
Katherine Robinson (disambiguation)